67th Daytona 200

Schedule
Wednesday March 4
9:00am  – 9:30am Practice   SuperSport (SC)
9:45am – 10:45am Practice    American Superbike (SC)
11:15am – 12:15pm Practice   SunTrust Moto-GT (LC)
12:30pm – 1:30pm Practice  Daytona SportBike (LC) 
1:30pm  – 2:30pm Mid-day Break
2:30pm  –  3:30pm Practice   SuperSport
3:45pm  –  4:45pm Practice   American Superbike with Safety Car
5:15pm  –  6:15pm Practice   SunTrust Moto-GT
6:30pm  –  8:00pm Practice  Daytona SportBike with Safety Car

Thursday March 5
8:00am – 9:00am Qualifying  SunTrust Moto-GT
9:15am – 9:45am Basic Qualifying Daytona Sportbike
10:15am – 10:45am Basic Qualifying American Superbike
11:00am – 11:30am Qualifying  SuperSport
11:45pm – 12:30pm SuperPole American Superbike
12:30pm – 1:30pm Mid-day Break
12:40pm Autograph Session – American Superbike, Daytona Sportbike and SunTrust Moto-GT in the Sprint FANZONE
1:30pm  Opening Ceremonies - SuperSport
2:00pm 35-Mile Race SuperSport
3:00pm  Opening Ceremonies - American Superbike
3:30pm  50-Mile Race American Superbike
6:30pm SuperPole Daytona SportBike

Friday March 6
2:00pm – 2:30pm Warm-Up  SunTrust Moto-GT
2:45pm – 3:15pm Warm-Up  Daytona SportBike
3:30pm Opening Ceremonies - SunTrust Moto-GT
4:00pm 2  Hour Race SunTrust Moto-GT
7:15pm Opening Ceremonies - Daytona SportBike
8:00pm Daytona 200 By Honda Cumguzzler

AMA Pro American Superbike

Results
1. Mat Mladin (Suz GSX-R1000), 15 laps
2. Neil Hodgson (Hon CBR1000RR), -1.027 seconds
3. Tommy Hayden (Suz GSX-R1000), -1.028
4. Larry Pegram (Duc 1098R), -10.117
5. Blake Young (Suz GSX-R1000), -16.008
6. Ben Bostrom (Yam YZF-R1), -16.213
7. Aaron Yates (Suz GSX-R1000), -16.363
8. Josh Hayes (Yam YZF-R1), -28.358, ran off track
9. Michael Laverty (Suz GSX-R1000), -28.433
10. Geoff May (Suz GSX-R1000), -31.584
11. Jeff Wood (Suz GSX-R1000), -47.201
12. Aaron Gobert (Hon CBR1000RR), -57.270
13. Hawk Mazzotta (Suz GSX-R1000), -58.857
14. Chris Ulrich (Suz GSX-R1000), -58.950
15. Jeff Tigert (Hon CBR1000RR), -58.970
16. Scott Jensen (Suz GSX-R1000), -67.586
17. Barrett Long (Duc 1098R), -67.622
18. Scott Greenwood (Suz GSX-R1000), -67.942
19. Shane Narbonne (Suz GSX-R1000), -68.046
20. Mark Crozier (Yam YZF-R1), -71.556
21. Brett McCormick (Suz GSX-R1000), -77.907
22. Brad Hendry (Duc 1098R), -79.440
23. Dean Mizdal (Suz GSX-R1000), -93.973
24. Reno Karimian (Suz GSX-R1000), -93.944
25. Shawn Higbee (Buell 1125R), -1 lap
26. Johnny Rock Page (Yam YZF-R1), -1 lap, 17.135 seconds
27. Josh Graham (Yam YZF-R1), -1 lap, 27.725
28. David Loikits (Suz GSX-R1000), -1 lap, 41.847
29. Davie Stone (Hon CBR1000RR), -2 laps
30. David Anthony (Suz GSX-R1000), -7 laps, DNF
31. Taylor Knapp (Suz GSX-R1000), -11 laps, DNF, mechanical
32. Jake Holden (Hon CBR1000RR), -12 laps, DNF
33. Ryan Elleby (Suz GSX-R1000), -13 laps, DNF

AMA Pro Daytona SportBike

Entry List (85 as of 2-10-09)

AMA Superbike Championship
AMA
AMA
AMA
Motorsport in Daytona Beach, Florida